Crane climbing is the (usually illicit) act of climbing a crane. It is a worldwide phenomenon that was said to be growing in popularity in the mid-2010s, alongside the illicit climbing of skyscrapers, monuments, and other tall structures, known as buildering.

Canada's York Regional Police view crane climbers as thrillseekers influenced by the popularity of crane climbing videos on YouTube, and warns that in addition to putting themselves at risk, crane climbers put the lives of first responders at risk as well.

Crane climbers are routinely arrested and charged.

References

Types of climbing
Urban exploration